St. Louis Sheriff's Department may refer to:
The Sheriff's Department of the city of St. Louis, Missouri
The Sheriff's Department of St. Louis County, Missouri

See also 
 St. Louis Metropolitan Police Department
 St. Louis County Police Department

Sheriffs' offices of Missouri